Letticia Martinez (born July 16, 1995) is an American Paralympic swimmer who is both long course and short course American record holder.

Biography
Martinez was born in Las Cruces, New Mexico. At the age of three, she was diagnosed with Leber's congenital amaurosis. Martinez graduated from Las Cruces High School in 2013. She won a gold medal for  freestyle swim at 2011 Parapan American Games where she also got 2 silver medals for  breaststroke and freestyle.

References

Paralympic swimmers of the United States
Swimmers at the 2012 Summer Paralympics
Sportspeople from Las Cruces, New Mexico
American female breaststroke swimmers
American female freestyle swimmers
Living people
1995 births
S11-classified Paralympic swimmers
Medalists at the 2011 Parapan American Games
21st-century American women